Irène Tharin (18 July 1938 – 7 August 2016) was a French politician who served as Member of Parliament for Doubs's 4th constituency from 2002 to 2007.

She was Mayor of Seloncourt from 1993 to 2001.

Personal life 
Her daughter Annie Genevard is also a Member of Parliament in Doubs.

References 

1938 births
2016 deaths
People from Audincourt

Deputies of the 12th National Assembly of the French Fifth Republic
20th-century French women politicians
21st-century French women politicians
Women members of the National Assembly (France)
Politicians from Bourgogne-Franche-Comté
Union for a Popular Movement politicians
Women mayors of places in France